Marina Giordana (Rome, February 20, 1955) is an Italian actress.

She is the daughter of actors Marina Berti and Claudio Gora, and the sister of actors Andrea Giordana and Carlo Giordana.

Marina began her acting career with a role in the Italian comedy Che notte quella notte! (1976) and the little-known film Quella strana voglia d'amare (1977) but her best-known film is the gritty crime thriller La belva col mitra (a.k.a. The Beast With a Gun) from 1977, starring Helmut Berger and Marisa Mell.

However, Marina soon abandoned her film career and instead went on to act in numerous Italian 'fotoromanzi' (magazine photo novels illustrated with photographs instead of drawings) for publishing house Lancio. Marina worked at Lancio from late 1976 to early 1981 appearing in more than 90 fotoromanzi.

After her time at Lancio, Marina has continued her acting career with theatrical work that includes Shakespeare plays such as Love's Labours Lost (Pene d'amore perdute in Italian) and The Taming of the Shrew (La bisbetica domata in Italian), and Under Milk Wood (Sotto il bosco di latte in Italian) by Dylan Thomas.

Recent film roles include the award-winning drama Concorrenza sleale a.k.a. Unfair Competition (2001), directed by renowned filmmaker Ettore Scola, and the comedy Se fossi in te a.k.a. If I Were You (2001).

Marina has also done much acting for television. She appeared in some TV movies in the 1980s and participated in TV series such as L'ispettore Giusti (1999) directed by Sergio Martino, and Giornalisti (2000). Marina is also remembered for playing the regular role of Artemisia Scalzi during the first two seasons (2003–2004) of the TV series Elisa di Rivombrosa.

External links
 
 Official CV for Marina Giordana

Year of birth missing (living people)
Living people
Italian actresses